Endymion is a lunar impact crater that lies near the northeast limb of the Moon. It is located to the east of Mare Frigoris and north of Lacus Temporis. To the southwest is the somewhat smaller crater Atlas. Because of its location, Endymion has an oval appearance from foreshortening. Beyond the crater along the lunar limb is the Mare Humboldtianum.

The floor of Endymion has been covered in low-albedo lava that gives it a dark appearance and makes it relatively easy to locate. The floor is relatively smooth, with only a few craterlets located within the rim. A string of three lies near the northwestern inner wall. There is a wrinkle ridge crossing the crater floor, and near the center is a low, eroded hill that may be the summit of a central peak that is now almost completely submerged by lava. Faint streaks of ray material from Thales to the north-northwest cross the dark floor. The outer rampart is low, wide, and worn from impact erosion.

Satellite craters
By convention, these features are identified on lunar maps by placing the letter on the side of the crater midpoint that is closest to Endymion.

References

 

 
 
 
 
 
 
 
 
 
 
 
 

Impact craters on the Moon